Miss France 2015, the 85th edition of the Miss France pageant, was held on December 6, 2014 at Zénith d'Orléans in Orléans. Miss France 2014, Flora Coquerel of Orléanais (Centre-Val de Loire) crowned her successor Camille Cerf of Nord-Pas-de-Calais at the end of the event. She represented France at Miss Universe 2014. 
It was the first time that the pageant took place in Orléans and the third time in the Centre-Val de Loire region.

The ceremony was held at TF1, and was presented by Jean-Pierre Foucault and the national director Sylvie Tellier.

The winner was Miss Nord-Pas-de-Calais, Camille Cerf, who gave to her region its first ever Miss France title.

Results

Special prizes

Judges 
The names of the judges were announced on November, 24.:.

Contestants

Notes about the placements 

 Nord-Pas-de-Calais wins for the first time ever the Miss France pageant.
 Côte d'Azur and Provence are placed for sixth consecutive year.
 Roussillon is placed for the fifth consecutive year.
 Tahiti is placed for the third consecutive year as first runner-up.
 Alsace and Guadeloupe are placed for the second consecutive year.
 Nord-Pas-de-Calais and Picardy are placed for the first time since the Miss France 2013 pageant.
 Île-de-France is placed for the first time since the Miss France 2011 pageant.
 New Caledonia is placed for the first time since the Miss France 2008 pageant.
 Aquitaine is placed for the first time since the Miss France 2007 pageant.
 Centre is placed for the first time.

Crossovers 
Contestants who previously competed or will be competing at international beauty pageants:

Miss Universe
2014:  Nord-Pas-de-Calais – Camille Cerf (Top 15)
 (Miami)

Miss World
2015:  Tahiti – Hinarere Taputu (Top 11)
 (Sanya)

Miss International
2015:  Côte d'Azur – Charlotte Pironni (Unplaced)
 (Tokyo)

Miss Earth
2015:  Alsace – Alyssa Wurtz (Top 16)
 (Vienna)

References

External links

2014 in France
Miss France
2014 beauty pageants